The Story of a Story is a 1915 American short fantasy film directed by Tod Browning.

Cast
 Eugene Pallette as John Penhallow
 Miriam Cooper as His daughter
 Frankie Newman
 Charles Lee
 Claire Anderson

References

External links

1915 films
1910s fantasy films
1915 short films
American silent short films
American black-and-white films
Films directed by Tod Browning
American fantasy films
1910s American films